Spirits is a double album by Keith Jarrett on which he does not perform solo piano, jazz standards or the kind of music he is usually known for. Instead he performs vocals, guitar, glockenspiel, soprano saxophone, recorder, piano, tabla, flutes and percussion on multiple tracks that were recorded at his home studio (aka Cavelight Studios) in New Jersey. It was released by ECM Records in 1986 and Jarrett dedicated it to his wife Rose Ann Colavito.

Background and inception
According to Edward Strickland in his book "American Composers: Dialogues on Contemporary Music"

Original liner notes 
On the double CD release (ECM 1333/34, 829 ) Keith Jarrett himself writes extensive liner notes where he states that:

Reception
Among mixed enthusiasm after such a different output in Jarrett's previous production, the Rough Guide to Jazz states :

According to Tom Moon at NPR the album is "an experimental (and unfairly disregarded) transfixing two-disc vision quest recorded between May and July 1985 by Jarrett alone in a studio in New Jersey".

While Allmusic review by non-jazz or "ethno" music specialist,  The Tina Turner Story author Ron Wynn awarded the album 3 stars, calling it, "More a technical showcase than a musically worthy enterprise", other views have contested those claims as "incompetent".

In 2002, on occasion of the double CD "Rarum: Selected Recordings of Keith Jarrett" release (which contains Spirits #2, #13, #16, #20 and #25) a "Various All About Jazz staff members" review states that the tracks belonging to "Spirits, a totally flat overdubbed solo record from '85, stand as a terrible exception to Jarrett's usual freshness and verve."

Track listing
All compositions by Keith Jarrett
Spirits Vol. 1:  
 "Spirits 1" - 5:07
 "Spirits 2" - 1:37
 "Spirits 3" - 8:04
 "Spirits 4" - 5:56
 "Spirits 5" - 4:10
 "Spirits 6" - 1:58
 "Spirits 7" - 7:09
 "Spirits 8" - 4:52
 "Spirits 9" - 5:12
 "Spirits 10" - 3:27
 "Spirits 11" - 2:36
 "Spirits 12" - 4:47
Spirits Vol. 2:  
 "Spirits 13" - 5:09
 "Spirits 14" - 3:06
 "Spirits 15" - 2:26
 "Spirits 16" - 2:10
 "Spirits 17" - 2:57
 "Spirits 18" - 6:20
 "Spirits 19" - 4:50
 "Spirits 20" - 5:13
 "Spirits 21" - 4:21
 "Spirits 22" - 3:08
 "Spirits 23" - 4:04
 "Spirits 24" - 3:02
 "Spirits 25" - 2:18
 "Spirits 26" - 6:12

Personnel
Keith Jarrett – Flute [Pakistani, Alto Vermont Folk], Tabla [3 Sets], Shaker [South American], Recorder [Ebony Moeck Sopranino, Ebony Moeck Soprano, Ebony Moeck Alto, Ebony Moeck Tenor, White Maple Moeck Bass, White Maple Moeck Great Bass], Voice, Saxophone [King Straight Soprano], Piano [Steinway], Guitar [Orozco], Glockenspiel [Miniature], Tambourine [Small], Cowbell [African Double], Baglama [Saz]

References 

ECM Records albums
Keith Jarrett albums
1985 albums
Albums produced by Manfred Eicher